Poulos is the Greek-origin surname for:

 Brett Poulos, involved in a 2010 dispute over First Amendment rights
 Dimmi Poulos, nickname of Dimitra Tsiliaskopoulos, Australian football goalkeeper
 Ernie T. Poulos (1926–1997), American Thoroughbred horse trainer
 George R. Poulos, Michigan politician
 Georgios Poulos, Nazi collaborator during the Axis occupation of Greece
 Ioannis Poulos, Greek fencer competitor at the 1896 Summer Olympics in Athens
 Jimmy Poulos (born 1952), American player of gridiron football
 John Poulos (1947–1980), American drummer, original member of the band The Buckinghams
 Leah Poulos-Mueller (born 1951), American former speed skater

It can also refer to:
 Alex Poulos, a fictional character from the Australian soap opera Home and Away
 Leah Poulos, birth name of Leah Patterson-Baker, another fictional character of the Australian soap opera Home and Away
 Poulos v. New Hampshire, a 1953 case of the Supreme Court of the United States
 -poulos, a common surname suffix found in some Greek families